Mike Randall (born March 27, 1962) is a retired American Nordic combined skier who competed in the 1984 Winter Olympics.

References

1962 births
Living people
American male Nordic combined skiers
Olympic Nordic combined skiers of the United States
Nordic combined skiers at the 1984 Winter Olympics